The Lewiston Community Building is a historic building in Lewiston, Utah. It was built in 1935, and designed by Karl C. Schaub. It has been listed on the National Register of Historic Places since April 1, 1985.

It is PWA Moderne in style.

References

PWA Moderne architecture in Utah
National Register of Historic Places in Cache County, Utah
Buildings and structures completed in 1935
1935 establishments in Utah